Senator Markley may refer to:

Joe Markley (born 1956), Connecticut State Senate
Philip Swenk Markley (1789–1834), Pennsylvania State Senate